Patriarch John XII may refer to:

 John XII bar Maʿdani, Syriac Orthodox Patriarch of Antioch in 1252–1263
 John XII of Constantinople, Ecumenical Patriarch of Constantinople in 1294–1303
 Pope John XII of Alexandria, Pope of Alexandria & Patriarch of the See of St. Mark in 1480–1483
 John XII Peter El Hajj, Maronite Patriarch of Antioch in 1890–1898